Hannington Muhumuza Wacha (born June 15, 1988), also simply known as Producer Hannz or Hannz Tactiq, is a Ugandan hip hop and Dancehall producer and DJ. He is the CEO of Hannz Records located in Makindye, Kampala. He has worked with most of Uganda's top hip hop and dancehall musicians including Navio, Rabadaba, Dr. Jose Chameleone, Bebe Cool, Sheebah Karungi, Mun-G and many more.

Career
Hannz started his studio Hannz Records in his single room at University. He later joined Audio Institute America (AIA) in the US where he started sound engineering and record production.

In 2017, Hannz and Dave Dash started up an online radio station called “IAM RADIO” aimed at creating awareness
about drugs in the youth, empowering the youth through sharing real life stories in order to help
and educate them as well as promoting Ugandan music.

Personal life
Hannz Tactiq is the third born in a family of five. His adoptive father Mr John Turwomwe (R.I.P) and mother Ms Linda Peel took him to Kitante Primary, Makerere College, Namasagali, Taibah College. He completed his education at Nkumba University graduating with an IT degree.

Discography
Owakabi by Jose Chameleone 2012(Co-Written, Produced and Mixed)
Bring it On by Jose Chameleone 2013(Produced and Mixed) 
Gira Tugire by Mun G 2013 (Produced and Mixed whole Album) 
Tebakusobola by Yung Mulo 2014 (Produced and Mixed Whole Album)
Muliwa by Apass 2015 (Produced and mixed)
Kasta Omanyi Mun G and Nutty Neithan 2015 (Produced and Mixed)
Step Pon Floor by Atlas and Mighty son  2010(Written, Produced, Mixed Whole Album)
Koi Koi by GNL Zamba 2009 (Produced and Mixed Whole Album)
Young Cardamon & HAB “Kanda [Chap Chap]”
Bwekiri - Rabadaba
Mukyamu - Rabadaba
Sesetulla - Baboon Forest Entertainment Mun G
Teli Aluleeta - GNL Zamba
Breathe-Na-Na-Na-Na-Na  - Jackie Ft  DJ Langona
Nkwata Nkwata - Mighty Son
Shankarabarabi - Mun-G
Banyirira-Kampala-Gals - Allan Toniks
Omu ku Omu Navio - Feat. Yung Mulo

Filmography

Awards and nominations

External links
Queen of Katwe Soundtracks

References

1988 births
Living people
Musicians from Kampala
Ugandan musicians
Ugandan record producers